The Hunt for White Christ is the thirteenth studio album by Swedish death metal band Unleashed, released on October 26, 2018 via Napalm.

The Hunt for White Christ is based on conceptual storyline written by bassist and vocalist Johnny Hedlund about the world of Odalheim and their Midgard warriors, sharing the same story with As Yggdrasil Trembles (2010), Odalheim (2012) and Dawn of the Nine (2015).

Track listing

Personnel
Unleashed
 Johnny Hedlund – vocals, bass
 Fredrik Folkare – lead guitar
 Tomas Måsgard – rhythm guitar
 Anders Schultz – drums

Production
 Fredrik Folkare – production, mixing
 Erik Mårtensson – mastering
 Pär Olofsson – cover art
 Joakim Sterner – design
 Jens Rydén – photography

Charts

References

2018 albums
Unleashed (band) albums
Napalm Records albums
Death metal albums